Andrew James McNally (born 3 December 1973 in Perth, Western Australia) is an Australian baseball player. He represented Australia at the 1996 Summer Olympics.

References

1973 births
Olympic baseball players of Australia
Australian baseball players
Baseball players at the 1996 Summer Olympics
Living people
Sportspeople from Perth, Western Australia
Baseball people from Western Australia